Razi ibn Abu Turab Mashadi (known as Danesh) (died 1665) was Iranian Poet laureate of the Mughal Empire between 1655 and 1662.

Life 
He was born in Isfahan. His father was a poet who immigrated to India and died in 1650 in Heydarabad. Danesh went to India before the death of his father. Danesh sang a Qasida in the court of Shah Jahan and gained 2000 Rupees. Also, he served Shah Jahan and Shah Shoja Mozaffari.

Sources 

People from Mashhad
1665 deaths
Iranian male poets
17th-century poets
Iranian emigrants to the Mughal Empire
Mughal Empire poets